Tumusla is a village in the Nor Chichas Province, in the Potosí Department of Bolivia.

References 

Populated places in Potosí Department